This phylogeny of pterosaurs entails the various phylogenetic trees used to classify pterosaurs throughout the years and varying views of these animals. Pterosaur phylogeny is currently highly contested and several hypotheses are presented below.

Unwin (2003)
The matrix includes 19 pterosaur groups (most of which are supra-specific) plus a single outgroup (Euparkeria capensis). The taxa were coded for 60 characters.

Kellner (2003)
The matrix includes 39 valid pterosaur species, although Rhamphorhynchus longicaudus and Nyctosaurus bonneri are usually considered to be synonymous with R. muensteri and N. gracilis respectively, plus a three outgroup species (Ornithosuchus longidens, Herrerasaurus ischigualastensis and Scleromochlus taylori). The taxa were coded for 74 characters.

Andres and Myers (2013)
In 2010, Brian Blake Andres wrote a review of pterosaur phylogeny in his dissertation. His phylogenetic analysis combined data mainly from three different matrixes: Kellner's original analysis (2003) and its updates (Kellner (2004), Wang et al. (2005) and Wang et al. (2009)), Unwin's original analysis (2003) and its updates (Unwin (2002), Unwin (2004), Lu et al. (2008) and Lu et al. (2009)) and previous analyses by Andres et al. (2005), Andres and Ji (2008) and Andres et al. (2010). Additional characters are taken from DallaVecchia (2009), Bennett' analyses (1993–1994) and various older, non-phylogenetic, papers.

The matrix includes 100 valid pterosaur species plus a single outgroup (Euparkeria capensis). This represents 70.4% of 142 known pterosaur species back then. These were scored for 183 morphological characters (compared to 3 outgroups plus 57 ingroups which were scored for 89 characters of Wang et al. 2009 [the latest version of Kellner's analysis] and to 1 outgroups plus 59 ingroups which were scored for 117 characters of Lu et al. 2012 [the latest version of Unwin's analysis]). The resultant topology is well supported and more resolved than previous analyses. Furthermore, it codes only species as terminal taxa, (unlike some analyses, e.g., Unwin (2003) who used mainly families) and uses the holotype specimens for the codings (unlike some analyses, e.g., Kellner (2003)). This phylogenetic analysis was used by Richard J. Butler, Stephen L. Brusatte, Brian B. Andres and Roger B. J. Benson (2012) to assess the morphological diversity and fossil sampling biases of the Pterosauria. A paper focusing on the pterosaur phylogeny (Andres) was published in a book named "The Pterosauria". An updated and more resolved version of this phylogeny was published formally by Andres and Timothy Myers in 2013, containing 185 characters and 109 ingroup taxa. Below is a cladogram showing these results after the exclusion of three taxa that can be coded only for one character (clade names follow Andres & Myers, 2013).

See also
 List of pterosaurs
 Pterosaur
 Graphical timeline of pterosaurs

References

Pterosauria @ Mikko's Phylogeny Archive
Kellner, A. W. A., (2003): Pterosaur phylogeny and comments on the evolutionary history of the group. pp. 105–137. — in Buffetaut, E. & Mazin, J.-M., (eds.) (2003): Evolution and Palaeobiology of Pterosaurs. Geological Society of London, Special Publications 217, London, 1–347
Peters, D., (2007): The origin and radiation of the Pterosauria — in Flugsaurier: The Wellnhofer pterosaur meeting, Munich, 2007, 27–28
Unwin, D. M., 2003: On the phylogeny and evolutionary history of pterosaurs. pp. 139–190. — in Buffetaut, E. & Mazin, J.-M., (eds.) (2003): Evolution and Palaeobiology of Pterosaurs. Geological Society of London, Special Publications 217, London, 1–347
Wellnhofer, P., (1991): The Illustrated Encyclopedia of Pterosaurs. Salamander Books Ltd., London, pp. 192

Pterosaurs